Heliophanus furvus is a jumping spider species in the genus Heliophanus that lives in Lesotho. It was first identified in 2014.

References

Salticidae
Spiders of Africa
Fauna of Lesotho
Spiders described in 2014
Taxa named by Wanda Wesołowska